The  Dallas Cowboys season was the team's 11th in the National Football League (NFL).

Dallas outscored their opponents 299–221, and finished first in their division for the fifth consecutive season. In 1970, the club made its debut on Monday Night Football on November 16, but were shut out 38–0 by the visiting St. Louis Cardinals. The Cowboys advanced to their first Super Bowl, but lost to the Baltimore Colts.

NFL Draft

Regular season
The Cowboys had to overcome many obstacles during the regular season. Fullback Calvin Hill, the team's second leading rusher with 577 yards and 4 touchdowns, was lost for the year after suffering a leg injury late in the regular season. And wide receiver Bob Hayes was benched by head coach Tom Landry for poor performances on several occasions.

Most significantly, the Cowboys had a quarterback controversy between Craig Morton and Roger Staubach. Morton and Staubach alternated as the starting quarterback during the regular season, but Landry eventually chose Morton to start Super Bowl V because he felt less confident that Staubach would follow his game plan (Landry called all of Morton's plays in Super Bowl V). Also, Morton had done extremely well in the regular season, throwing for 1,819 yards and 15 touchdowns, with seven interceptions, earning him a passer rating of 89.8. In contrast, Staubach, although a noted scrambler and able to salvage broken plays effectively, threw for 542 yards, and only two touchdowns with eight interceptions, giving him a 42.9 rating.

Hayes was the main deep threat on the team, catching 34 passes for 889 yards (a 26.1 yards per catch average) and 10 touchdowns, while also rushing 4 times for 34 yards and another touchdown, and adding another 116 yards returning punts. On the other side of the field, wide receiver Lance Rentzel recorded 28 receptions for 556 yards and 5 touchdowns.

However, the main strength on the Cowboys offense was their running game. Rookie running back Duane Thomas rushed 151 times for 803 yards (a 5.1 yards per carry average) and 5 touchdowns, while adding another 416 yards returning kickoffs. Fullback Walt Garrison, who replaced the injured Hill, provided Thomas with excellent blocking and rushed for 507 yards and 3 touchdowns himself. Garrison was also a good receiver out of the backfield, catching 21 passes for 205 yards and 2 touchdowns. Up front, Pro Bowl guard John Niland and future Hall of Famer tackle Rayfield Wright anchored the offensive line.

The Cowboys had their lowest regular season (6–2 vs. Cleveland Browns) and playoff (5–0 vs. Detroit Lions) scoring games in franchise history. The playoff victory over Detroit on December 26 remains the lowest scoring postseason game in NFL history. Through the  season, they are the only games to finish with those scores. 

For the first time, the Cowboys defeated the Green Bay Packers; this year's game was on Thanksgiving on the new artificial turf of the Cotton Bowl. Green Bay had won the first six contests, four in the regular season (1960, 1964, 1965, 1968) and two in NFL championship games (1966, 1967). The Packers won the next meeting in Green Bay in 1972.

Schedule

Division opponents are in bold text

Game summaries

Week 1 at Eagles

Week 2

Bob Hayes 5 Rec, 112 Yds

Week 3

Week 4

Week 5

Week 6

Week 7

Week 8

Week 9

Week 10

Week 11

Thanksgiving Day

Week 12

Week 13

Week 14

Standings

Postseason

NFC Divisional Playoff

The Cowboys shut down the Lions offense and took advantage of a first-quarter field goal to outlast the Lions in the lowest-scoring playoff game in NFL history.

NFC Championship Game

Super Bowl V

Chuck Howley became the first defensive player, and only member of a losing team to be the Super Bowl's Most Valuable Player.

Roster

Awards and records
 Chuck Howley, Most Valuable Player, Super Bowl V
 Mel Renfro, Pro Bowl Defensive Most Valuable Player

Publications
The Football Encyclopedia 
Total Football 
Cowboys Have Always Been My Heroes

References

External links
 1970 Dallas Cowboys
 Pro Football Hall of Fame
 Dallas Cowboys Official Site

Dallas
Dallas Cowboys seasons
National Football Conference championship seasons
NFC East championship seasons
Dallas Cowboys